Verkhny Reutets is a rural locality and the administrative center of Vyshnereutchansky Selsoviet Rural Settlement, Medvensky District, Kursk Oblast, Russia. Population:

Geography 

 Streets
There are the following streets in the locality: Babinka, Beloborodovka, Bolshoye, Bugor, Domiki, Gavrilovka, Grunt, Istomovka, Klyuchik, Lebedinovka, Lomanovka, Magazinnaya, Mordashovka, Nizhnevka, Podturshchina, Ragozevka, Voronovka and Zalozhenka (415 houses).

 Climate
Verkhny Reutets has a warm-summer humid continental climate (Dfb in the Köppen climate classification).

Transport 

References

Notes

Sources

Rural localities in Medvensky District